The 1856 United States presidential election in Texas was held on November 4, 1856, as part of the 1856 United States presidential election. State voters chose four electors to represent the state in the Electoral College, which chose the president and vice president.

Texas voted for the Democratic nominee James Buchanan, who received 67% of the vote. Texas was Buchanan's second strongest state.

Republican Party nominee John C. Frémont was not on the ballot. Texas would never be won by a Republican candidate until Herbert Hoover narrowly won the state in 1928.

Results

See also
 United States presidential elections in Texas

References

1856
Texas
1856 in Texas